Tom Rasberry is an exterminator from Pearland, Texas, who first identified the Rasberry crazy ant in 2002. The ants have been known to short out many different types of electrical apparatus. Rasberry estimates that he has spent over 2000 hours researching them.

Pest control career
Rasberry started Budget Pest Control in 1989; the name was changed to Rasberry's Pest Professionals in late 2009.

NASA career
The Johnson Space Center hired Rasberry in 2008 in an attempt to keep the ants out of their facilities. Rasberry found three colonies at the NASA site, but all were small enough to control.

References

External links
 Rasberry's Pest Professionals official website
 "Houston, We Have a Problem", Texas A&M University System – publication about Rasberry ants
 "Rasberry Crazy Ants", Texas Parks and Wildlife – publication about Rasberry ants
 Texas Invasive Plant and Pest Council publication about Rasberry ants

American entomologists
Year of birth missing (living people)
Living people
People from Pearland, Texas
Myrmecologists
Scientists from Texas
Pest control companies of the United States